The Pat Malley Fitness and Recreation Center at Santa Clara University was constructed in 1999 and provided ample new space for on-campus recreational activities. Dedicated October 8, 1999, the center is the primary sports and fitness center for the general population at Santa Clara University.

Built at a cost of $8.8 million, the  facility is named for legendary SCU football coach   Pat Malley and includes three full basketball/volleyball courts, a large weight room, two locker rooms, a  multipurpose room, lounge space, and new offices for recreation and wellness programs. As weight and fitness facilities are available for University athletics in the Leavey Center, Malley is always open to the campus community for recreational use.

SCU alumni, including many of Coach Malley's former football players, were significantly involved in the financing, planning and construction of the facility, which includes approximately $400,000 in exercise equipment. 

Daily attendance of SCU students, staff, faculty and alumni at the 44,000-square-foot fitness center averaged about 1,200 (more than 25% of the undergraduate population) per day in its first month of operation.  The tile-roof and adobe-wall structure situated next to the   Leavey Activities Center and pool on the east side of the SCU campus was designed by Cannon architects of Los Angeles. 

Gary J. Filizetti, SCU '67, is one of several former Bronco football players who were instrumental in the planning and fundraising for the project. He is president of DEVCON Inc. of Milpitas, general contractor for the project. DEVCON's manager for the SCU project was another Bronco football player coached by Malley, Andy Schatzman, SCU '83. At the dedication ceremonies, a large mural honoring Malley, the late SCU football coach, was unveiled.

The  weight room is named the Filizetti-McPherson Weight Room, after Filizetti's father, John, and Bill McPherson, SCU '54, the former Santa Clara and San Francisco 49ers assistant coach. The lobby area was donated by another Bronco, former 49er Brent Jones, SCU '85, and his wife Dana, SCU '86.

Master of ceremonies at the dedication was John Ottoboni, SCU '69, a San Jose lawyer who as a member of the SCU Board of Trustees was an early advocate of the Malley Center project. 

A highlight of the October 8 dedication ceremony was the unveiling of the Malley mural: three 74-inch-by-56-inch photo montages of Malley silk-screened on blue glass, under the titles, Coach, Educator, Friend; above a limestone panel inscribed with a quote from the coach.

The mural was designed by SCU Marketing Communications Art Director Greg Mar and Tony Tirapelli and was constructed by General Graphics of San Francisco, which does the displays and graphics for the San Francisco Museum of Modern Art. An interactive video kiosk with a large plasma display screen directs visitors to Malley Center activities and informs them about the university and its programs.

In November of 2017, SCU opened an outdoor fitness area located across from the Malley Fitness Center that provides ab benches, monkey bars, gymnastics rings, pull up stations, a cargo net and rope climbs, stall bars, balance beams, plyo boxes, as well as an outdoor ping pong table.

Other alumni involvement in the center's construction includes:

 The Class of '61 Multi-Purpose Room 
 The Hayden Gymnasium -- The William R. and Virginia Hayden Foundation (Stan Hayden, SCU '63) 
 The Nelson Wellness Center - Dick, SCU '69, and Nancy Nelson 
 The Anne Halligan Helmstein Women's Locker Room - the wife of the late Homer Helmstein, SCU '37 
 The Albanese Family Men's Locker Room - Jos. Albanese Inc. (Joseph J. Albanese, SCU '40, John L. Albanese, SCU '70), Central Concrete (Bill Albanese, SCU '65 and Thomas Albanese, SCU '68 
 The Souza Family Courtyard - Lou Souza, SCU '57 
 The Blair Family Patio - Jim, Donna and Ronald (SCU '93) Blair 
 The Class of '67 Conference Room

Membership
Current Students, Faculty and Staff: Free of charge
Alumni: Passes available for $400 a per year (2008)
Day Passes: $5 daily fee for guests (2008)

References

Santa Clara Broncos